Hooper House may refer to:

Hooper House (Baltimore County, Maryland), historic house in the Bauhaus style by architect Marcel Breuer
James E. Hooper House, Baltimore, Maryland, listed on the NRHP
Hooper House (Swansea, Massachusetts), historic house
Bevard House, also known as Hooper House in Bradshaw, Maryland

See also
Hooper-Eliot House, Cambridge, Massachusetts, listed on the NRHP in Massachusetts
Hooper-Lee Nichols House, Cambridge, Massachusetts, listed on the NRHP in Massachusetts
Robert "King" Hooper Mansion, Marblehead, Massachusetts, listed on the NRHP in Massachusetts
Hooper–Bowler–Hillstrom House, Belle Plaine, Minnesota, listed on the NRHP in Minnesota
Nash-Hooper House, Hillsborough, North Carolina, listed on the NRHP in North Carolina
Dr. D. D. Hooper House, Sylva, North Carolina, listed on the National Register of Historic Places in Jackson County, North Carolina
Jessie Jack Hooper House, Oshkosh, Wisconsin, listed on the National Register of Historic Places in Winnebago County, Wisconsin